The FIM Veteran Motocross World Cup is a motorcross championship for more experienced riders, inaugurated in 2006, and is a feeder series to the FIM Motocross World Championship.

Champions

Motocross World Championship